Julio Lozano Díaz (27 March 1885 – 20 August 1957), was first Vice President of Honduras (1949–1954) and then President of Honduras, from 5 December 1954 until 21 October 1956.

He was born in Tegucigalpa, Honduras, and worked as an accountant for the Rosario Mining Company. He was Minister of Finance of Honduras from 1934 to 1936.

Lozano assumed presidential authority on 16 November 1954 while President Juan Manuel Gálvez was out of the country seeking medical attention. In December, citing a constitutional crisis over the stalemated presidential elections, he proclaimed himself the chief of state and he began instituting his own policies. Generally unpopular, and in ill health, Lozano was forced to resign by the military. He won a democratic election in 1956, but the result was deemed illegitimate and was annulled by the military junta.

Lozano Diaz died the following year in Miami, Florida.

References

 Short biography

1885 births
1957 deaths
People from Tegucigalpa
Honduran people of Spanish descent
National Party of Honduras politicians
Presidents of Honduras
Vice presidents of Honduras
Finance Ministers of Honduras
Leaders who took power by coup
Accountants